Phreatodytes is a genus of beetles in the family Noteridae, containing the following species:

 Phreatodytes archaeicus Uéno, 1996
 Phreatodytes elongatus Uéno, 1996
 Phreatodytes latiusculus Uéno, 1996
 Phreatodytes mohrii Uéno, 1996
 Phreatodytes relictus Uéno, 1957
 Phreatodytes sublimbatus Uéno, 1996

References

Noteridae